The 2008 BWF Super Series was the second season of the BWF Super Series. The season spanned between the continental of Asia and Europe and was starting with Malaysia Open from January 15 and ended with Hong Kong Open on November 30, 2008. The top eight ranked players competed in the Masters Finals in Kota Kinabalu, Sabah, Malaysia from December 18 to December 21, 2008.

Schedule
Below is the schedule released by the Badminton World Federation:

Results

Winners

Performances by countries
Tabulated below are the Super Series performances based on countries. Only countries who have won a title are listed:

Super Series Rankings
All the progress and points below are carry forward from the tournament for past 52 weeks as state by BWF's world ranking system.

Leader progress
Tabulated below are the leader progress in Super Series ranking towards the Super Series Final:

Men's singles

Women's singles

Men's doubles

Women's doubles

Mixed doubles

References

 
BWF Super Series